Ioannis G. Tsatsaris (born 1934 in Daphnoula; died in 2022) was a Greek writer.  He wrote many books on the paranormal and the nature of spirituality, including True stories of para-natural phenomena from Mount Pindos; The Revelation after Ioannis; The Next Step of Creation — The Revelation; and Man on his Unknown Path — The Apocalypse.  He claimed to be inspired by "Higher Positions of the Universes", which provide him with unique insight into the subject matter of his books.

His fifth book is “Aestheseogonies” . In it, he reveals all the anatomy of the functional mechanism of the Individual, but also the biological function of Nature. His latest book, the sixth one, called "I GNOSI" ("Η ΓΝΩΣΗ"), refers to all those issues that one, since one makes his appearance on earth, is obliged to learn.

His books are prefaced by conventional university professors and researchers.
Several people who met him have stated on camera that he was a person with special knowledge and capabilities. None of them mentioned that he ever asked for money (or other benefits) for the help he provided to others.

References

External links
Official website
Epistos publications: Tsatsaris

1934 births
2022 deaths
20th-century Greek male writers
21st-century Greek male writers
People from Andritsaina